Mitochondrial pyruvate carrier 2 (MPC2) also known as brain protein 44 (BRP44) is a protein that in humans is encoded by the MPC2 gene. It is part of the Mitochondrial Pyruvate Carrier (MPC) protein family. This protein is involved in transport of pyruvate across the inner membrane of mitochondria in preparation for the pyruvate dehydrogenase reaction.

Interactive pathway map

References

Further reading